Andy Lewis may refer to:
Andy Lewis (performer) (born 1986), American highliner and trickliner also known as Sketchy Andy
Andy Lewis (bassist) (1967–2000), original bass guitarist with Australian group The Whitlams
Andy Lewis (producer), English soul producer, best known for the album Billion Pound Project and his collaboration single with Paul Weller
Andy Lewis (screenwriter) (1925–2018), American Academy Award-nominated screenwriter, best known for working on Klute
Andy Lewis, guitarist of the Canadian Boys Night Out
Andy Lewis (cricketer) (born 1976), English cricketer
Andy Lewis (triathlete) (born 1983), British paratriathlete

See also
Andrew Lewis (disambiguation)